The Sovereign Award for Outstanding Jockey is a Canadian thoroughbred horse racing honour given annually since 1975 by the Jockey Club of Canada. Part of the Sovereign Awards, the "Outstanding Jockey" laurel is similar to the Eclipse Award given to jockeys in the United States.

Honourees:

1975 : Hugo Dittfach
1976 : Chris Rogers
1977 : Avelino Gomez
1978 : Sandy Hawley
1979 : Robin Platts
1980 : Gary Stahlbaum
1981 : Irwin Driedger
1982 : Lloyd Duffy
1983 : Larry Attard
1984 : Chris Loseth
1985 : Don Seymour
1986 : Larry Attard
1987 : Don Seymour
1988 : Sandy Hawley
1989 : Don Seymour
1990 : Don Seymour
1991 : Mickey Walls
1992 : Todd Kabel
1993 : Robert Landry
1994 : Robert Landry
1995 : Todd Kabel
1996 : Emile Ramsammy
1997 : Emile Ramsammy
1998 : David Clark
1999 : Patrick Husbands
2000 : Patrick Husbands
2001 : Patrick Husbands
2002 : Patrick Husbands
2003 : Todd Kabel
2004 : Todd Kabel
2005 : Todd Kabel
2006 : Todd Kabel
2007 : Patrick Husbands
2008 : Patrick Husbands
2009 : Patrick Husbands
2010 : Eurico Rosa Da Silva
2011 : Luis Contreras
2012 : Luis Contreras
2013: Eurico Rosa Da Silva
2014: Patrick Husbands
2015: Eurico Rosa Da Silva
2016: Eurico Rosa Da Silva
2017: Eurico Rosa Da Silva
2018: Eurico Rosa Da Silva
2019: Eurico Rosa Da Silva
2020: Rafael Hernandez

See also
Sovereign Award for Outstanding Apprentice Jockey

References
The Sovereign Awards at the Jockey Club of Canada website

Horse racing awards
Horse racing in Canada